Keelakudiyiruppu is a village in the Udayarpalayam taluk of Ariyalur district, Tamil Nadu, India.

Demographics 

As per the 2001 census, Keelakudiyiruppu had a total population of 3979 with 1956 males and 2023 females.

References 

Villages in Ariyalur district